G protein-coupled receptor 114 is a protein encoded by the ADGRG5 gene. GPR114 is a member of the adhesion GPCR family.
Adhesion GPCRs are characterized by an extended extracellular region often possessing N-terminal protein modules that is linked to a TM7 region via a domain known as the GPCR-Autoproteolysis INducing (GAIN) domain.

GPR114 mRNA is specifically expressed in human eosinophils as well as in mouse lymphocytes, monocytes, macrophage, and dendritic cells.

Signaling 
The cyclic adenosine monophosphate (cAMP) assay in overexpressing HEK293 cells has demonstrated coupling of GPR114 to Gαs protein.

References

External links 
 Adhesion GPCR consortium

G protein-coupled receptors